Flor de Caña Fútbol Club is a Nicaraguan football team, based in Chichigalpa, Managua.

History
They have played at the country's top level for several years, winning the league twice.

Achievements
Primera División de Nicaragua: 2
 1966, 1967

Performance in CONCACAF competitions
CONCACAF Champions' Cup: 1 appearances
Best: First Round in 1967
1967 : First Round

Record versus other nations
 As of 2013-09-13
The Concacaf opponents below = Official tournament results: 
(Plus a sampling of other results)

References

Football clubs in Nicaragua